Todd Woodbridge and Mark Woodforde were the defending champions but lost in the final 3–6, 7–6, 6–4 against Jan Apell and Jonas Björkman.

Seeds
The top four seeded teams received byes into the second round.

Draw

Finals

Top half

Bottom half

External links
 1994 Stella Artois Championships Doubles Draw

Doubles